Yusef Kandi (also Romanized as Yūsef Kandī, Yūsefkandī, and Yūsof Kandī; also known as Yūsof Kand and Yusuf Kandi) is a Kurdish village in Mokriyan-e Gharbi Rural District, in the Central District of Mahabad County, West Azerbaijan Province, Iran. At the 2006 census, its population was 2,345, in 488 families.

References 

Populated places in Mahabad County